Hilario Camino (Moncado) Del Prado (November 4, 1898 – April 9, 1956) was a Filipino mystic and political activist. He was the founder and leader of the Filipino Crusaders World Army, a religious and patriotic group in the Philippines.

References

External links
Equi Frili Brium Iglesarium
Moncado and his Mission, Schaefle, Wm.J.; Moncado and his Mission, Filipino Federation of America

Filipino writers
1898 births
1956 deaths
People from Cebu
Candidates in the 1946 Philippine presidential election
Candidates in the 1941 Philippine presidential election